Roberto Lamarca Gabriele  (October 4, 1959 February 22, 2017) was an Italo-Venezuelan television actor. He is most recognised for his portrayal of Arístides Valerio, the recurring character on the Radio Caracas Televisión drama series Por estas calles.

Biography 
He had 2 brothers and 2 sisters. Lamarca was father of three children: Joselyn, Angélica and Sophia. The actor was married to Venezuelan actress Caridad Canelón.

Health and death 
On January 27, 2017 was hospitalized of emergency in a clinic capitalina, located in Altamira, due to the presentation of a respiratory complication. The actor underwent a biopsy in June 2016 to detect possible lung cancer in the middle of last year; But at that time the result was negative.

He died on the night of Wednesday, February 22, 2017 at the home of his "brother of life" Omar Meléndez, who was in a complicated health situation in the breath because he had a histoplasmosis for several months.

Filmography

References

External links 
 

1959 births
2017 deaths
20th-century Venezuelan male actors
21st-century Venezuelan male actors
Male actors from Caracas
Venezuelan male telenovela actors
Venezuelan male television actors